Tony Miller (born April 16, 1973) is an American former basketball coach and player. Miller was a two-time Dutch League All-Star in 1998 and 2000. During his collegiate career at Marquette University, Miller recorded 956 assists, which as of the end of the 2020–21 season still remains the eighth-highest total in NCAA Division I history.

Early life
Miller was born in Cleveland, Ohio. He attended Villa Angela-St. Joseph High School (VASJ) where he was a two-sport star between basketball and football. Miller was the starting point guard for all four seasons in basketball and led them to a state championship as a senior in 1991–92. In football, he became the starting quarterback in his sophomore season, succeeding future National Football League quarterback Elvis Grbac. Miller led the football squad to a state championship as a junior, a feat Grbac did not even accomplish. He wasn't heavily recruited from college basketball teams because it was thought he would play football at the next level instead, but then-Marquette head coach Kevin O'Neill was persistent in his recruitment, and eventually Miller signed to play for the Warriors.

College
In his four-year career spanning from 1991 and 1995, Miller started all 123 games in which he played. For his career he averaged 8.3 points and 7.8 assists while finishing with 1,027 and 956, respectively. His assists total ranks eighth all-time in Division I history, and was fifth all-time when he graduated. In his sophomore and junior seasons, Miller was the catalyst for Marquette's back-to-back NCAA Tournament berths; in the 1994 tournament, he was the primary reason why Marquette was able to break Kentucky's full-court press as the Warriors upset the Wildcats to advance to the Sweet 16. As a senior, Marquette were the runners-up in the 1995 National Invitation Tournament. Miller was a three-time Great Midwest Conference Second Team selection from 1993 to 1995.

Professional career
Miller played professional basketball from 1995–96 through 2007–08. In 13 seasons he played for different teams in the United States, Belgium, Lithuania, the Netherlands, and the United Kingdom. In 1997–98 and 2000–2001 he was a Dutch League All-Star. Miller finished his professional career playing in the British Basketball League for the Everton Tigers.

Coaching career
Miller's first job came in 2009–10 as the strength and conditioning manager for USC. He was hired by his former head coach at Marquette, Kevin O'Neill, who was then the USC head coach. In 2010–11, Miller was promoted to a full-time assistant coach position. He was not retained when Andy Enfield took over as head coach in 2013–14. Miller spent the 2013–14 season as an assistant coach at St. John Bosco High School in Bellflower, California, where he helped the team win a Division 2 state championship. He then moved on to become an assist for Cal State Los Angeles for two seasons before retiring from coaching.

See also
 List of NCAA Division I men's basketball career assists leaders

References

1973 births
Living people
Amsterdam Basketball players
American expatriate basketball people in Belgium
American expatriate basketball people in Lithuania
American expatriate basketball people in the Netherlands
American expatriate basketball people in the United Kingdom
American men's basketball players
Basketball players from Cleveland
Bree BBC players
British Basketball League players
Cal State Los Angeles Golden Eagles men's basketball coaches
Den Helder Kings players
High school basketball coaches in the United States
Marquette Golden Eagles men's basketball players
Point guards
Sportspeople from Cleveland
USC Trojans men's basketball coaches